The red-billed dwarf hornbill (Lophoceros camurus) is a species of hornbill in the family Bucerotidae.
It is distributed across the African tropical rainforest.

References

red-billed dwarf hornbill
Birds of the African tropical rainforest
red-billed dwarf hornbill
Taxonomy articles created by Polbot